This is the discography of Swedish indie rock/new wave band The Sounds. Since 2002, they have released five studio albums, one EP and 11 singles.

Studio albums

Extended plays

Singles

Notes
'*^ "No One Sleeps When I'm Awake" and "Beatbox" didn't chart on the Finnish Singles Chart, they did however chart on Finnish Airplay Chart ("No One Sleeps When I'm Awake") and Finnish Download Chart ("Beatbox") and chart positions are therefore taken from those charts.

US singles
 "Living in America" (2002)
 "Song with a Mission" (2006)
 "Painted by Numbers" (2006)
 "Tony the Beat" (2006)
 "No One Sleeps When I'm Awake" (2009)
 "Beatbox" (2010)

UK singles
 "Tony the Beat" (2007)
 "Painted by Numbers" UK Version (2007)

Compilations
 "Painted by Numbers" is included on Gothic Magazine'''s The Gothic Compilation 34.
 "Rock 'n' Roll" is featured on Viva La Bands Volume 1.
 "Rock 'n' Roll" & "Dance with Me"is featured on Final Destination 2 Soundtrack.
 "Ego" is featured on Viva La Bands Volume 2.
 "Queen Of Apology" is featured on Final Destination 3 Soundtrack.
 "Queen of Apology", remixed by Patrick Stump of Fall Out Boy, is featured on the Snakes on a Plane soundtrack.
"Something to Die For" & "Yeah Yeah Yeah", are feature on the Scream 4 Soundtrack.

Demos
"Under My Skin"
"Bombs Bombs Away" (Alt. version)
"Turn Back the Time (Breathe)"
"Go! (You Will Never See Me Down Again)"
"Come Inside (Stora)"
"She Moves"
"Free, Free, Free"
"Like a Lady" (Demo version)
"Fire" (Demo version)
"24 Hour Love"
"You Will Never See Me Down Again"

B-sides and other
"Bombs Bombs Away (Teenage Battlefield)" (from the German movie Big Girls Don't Cry)
"Goodbye 70s" (B-side available on the Japanese release of Dying To Say this to You'')
"Goodbye 70s" (Alt. Version)
"Night After Night (Reggae Version)" (Extremely Rare and Live Exclusive)
"Song with a Mission" (Dance Mix)
"Berkeley" (B-side for Painted By Numbers)
"Rock and Roll" (The Pop Rox Mix)
"Dreaming" (Blondie Tribute concert)
"Blue Motorbike" (Live performance with Moto Boy)
"Ego" (Alan Moulder UK Mix)
"We Are Your Friends" (Live performance)
"Tony the Beat" (Rex the Dog remix)
"All My life" (Performed by Krezip – Written by Jacqueline Govaert – Jesper Anderberg – Felix Rodriguez)
"Play This Game with Me" (Performed by Krezip – Written by Jacqueline Govaert – Jesper Anderberg – Felix Rodriguez)
"You're Wrong" (Performed by Krezip – Written by Jacqueline Govaert – Jesper Anderberg – Felix Rodriguez)
"Go to Sleep" (Performed by Krezip – Written by Jacqueline Govaert – Jesper Anderberg – Felix Rodriguez)

Tours
Crossing the Rubicon World Tour

References

Discographies of Swedish artists
Rock music group discographies
Pop music group discographies